In coordination chemistry and organometallic chemistry, transition metal imido complexes is a coordination compound containing an imido ligand. Imido ligands can be terminal or bridging ligands. The parent imido ligand has the formula NH, but most imido ligands have alkyl or aryl groups in place of H. The imido ligand is generally viewed as a dianion, akin to oxide.

Structural classes

Complexes with terminal imido ligands
In some terminal imido complexes, the M=N−C angle is 180° but often the angle is decidedly bent.  Complexes of the type M=NH are assumed to be intermediates in nitrogen fixation by synthetic catalysts.

Complexes with bridging imido ligands
Imido ligands are observed as doubly and, less often, triply bridging ligands.

Synthesis

From metal oxo complexes
Commonly metal-imido complexes are generated from metal oxo complexes. They arise by condensation of amines and metal oxides and metal halides:
LnMO  +  H2NR  →  LnMNR  +  H2O
This approach is illustrated by the conversion of MoO2Cl2 to the diimido derivative MoCl2(NAr)2(dimethoxyethane), precursors to the Schrock carbenes of the type Mo(OR)2(NAr)(CH-t-Bu).
LnMCl2 + 3 H2NR → LnMNR + 2 RNH3Cl

Aryl isocyanates react with metal oxides concomitant with decarboxylation:
LnMO + O=C=NR → LnMNR + CO2

Alternative routes
Some are generated from the reaction of low-valence metal complexes with azides:
LnM  +  N3R  →  LnMNR  +  N2
A few imido complexes have been generated by the alkylation of metal nitride complexes:
LnMN− + RX → LnMNR + X−

Utility
Metal imido complexes are mainly of academic interest.  They are however assumed to be intermediates in ammoxidation catalysis, in the Sharpless oxyamination, and in nitrogen fixation.

References

Coordination chemistry